Katja Windt is a researcher and professor of global production logistics who served as president of Jacobs University Bremen from 2014 until 2018.

Education
Windt received her doctorate in 2000 from the Institut für Fabrikanlagen und Logistik IFA (Institute of Production Systems and Logistics). During her studies she attended the Massachusetts Institute of Technology (MIT), Cambridge, Massachusetts, for one semester.

Academic career

Windt held a position as departmental manager at the Bremer Institut für Produktion und Logistik BIBA, (Bremen Institute for Production and Logistics) of the University of Bremen, where she worked in the field of autonomous cooperating logistic processes funded by the German Research Foundation.

On the staff of Jacobs University since 2008, Windt founded the university's Global Production Logistics Workgroup. In 2008 she won the Alfried Krupp Prize, a grant for young lecturers. She was named "Professor of the year 2008" by the German Association of University Professors and Lecturers.

In 2012, Windt was appointed as provost and vice-president of Jacobs University. In 2014 she became president of the same institution, and oversaw a financial restructuring of the institution. She resigned from this position in 2018.

Associations
Windt was a member and later a spokesperson of the Young Academy, a joint project of the Berlin-Brandenburg Academy of Sciences and Humanities and German Academy of Natural Scientists Leopoldina.

Other activities

Corporate boards
 Deutsche Post, Member of the Supervisory Board (since 2011)
 Fraport, Member of the Supervisory Board (since 2012)
 BLG Logistics, Member of the Advisory Board

Non-profit organizations
 German Logistics Association (BVL), Member of the Executive Board

References

External links
 Profile at Jacobs University
 „Alfried Krupp-Förderpreis 2008 für Katja Windt“, Pressemitteilung der Alfried Krupp von Bohlen und Halbach-Stiftung vom 2. Juli 2008; retrieved, 5 February 2009Press release of the Alfried Krupp von Bohlen und Halbach-Stiftung of 2 July 2008 (accessed 5 February 2009)

Academic staff of Jacobs University Bremen
Living people
Year of birth missing (living people)
Place of birth missing (living people)
Members of the German Academy of Sciences Leopoldina